PS-82 Jamshoro-III is a constituency of the Provincial Assembly of Sindh.

General elections 2013

General elections 2008

See also
 PS-81 Jamshoro-II
 PS-83 Dadu-I

References

External links
 Election commission Pakistan's official website
 Awazoday.com check result
 Official Website of Government of Sindh

Constituencies of Sindh